Antonín Malinkovič (13 August 1930 – 15 September 2016) was a Czechoslovak rower. He competed at the 1952 Summer Olympics in Helsinki with the men's double sculls where they came fifth.

References

1930 births
2016 deaths
Czechoslovak male rowers
Olympic rowers of Czechoslovakia
Rowers at the 1952 Summer Olympics
People from Břeclav
Sportspeople from the South Moravian Region